Road 41 is a road in Khuzestan Province of coastal southwestern Iran.

Route
It connects Khorramshahr to Ahvaz, along the Karun River in the Zagros Mountains.

See also
 Road 37 (Iran) — another road in region.

References

External links 

 Iran road map on Young Journalists Club

41
Transportation in Khuzestan Province